MSCA may refer to:

 Marie Skłodowska-Curie Actions, a set of major research fellowships in the European Research Area (ERA)
 McCarthy Scales of Children's Abilities
 Microsoft Campus Agreement
 Mount Saint Charles Academy